Kate Dempsey (born 1962), Irish based poet and founder of Kinsale Mead Co.

Biography
Born in Bishop's Stortford in 1962, Kate Dempsey grew up in Bothwell and Coventry. She went to Finham Park School before she graduated with a degree in Physics from St Hilda's College, Oxford. After college, she worked in IT and lived in the UK, Nijmegen in the Netherlands , and Albuquerque, New Mexico. She spent twenty-five years living in Maynooth. She is married to Denis Dempsey and together they founded Kinsale Mead Co. She has won a number of awards for her writing, The Plough Prize, the Cecil Day Lewis Award as well as commendations for the Patrick Kavanagh Award and The Forward Prizes for Poetry. She has also been shortlisted for Hennessy New Irish Writing Award. Dempsey runs a writers group called Poetry Divas. Her debut Poetry Collection, The Space Between, was published in 2016 by Doire Press.

Sources

1962 births
Irish poets
Living people